Soul Assassin is a 2001 thriller film directed by Laurence Malkin and starring Rena Owen, Kristy Swanson and Skeet Ulrich. It was released 24 July 2002.

Plot 
The film is about a young security agent, Kevin Burke, who is employed by a multinational banking firm. He intends to ask his girlfriend Rosalind to marry him.

Interpol suspected Jorgensen's firm of money laundering, based on anonymous tips. When Jorgensen finds out there is a mole in his firm, he suspects Rosalind and has her murdered by a hitman from the Barcelona branch of the firm. Kevin then swears to avenge Rosalind's death.

With the help of Tessa Jansen, an Interpol agent, Kevin learns that Jorgensen has had his father murdered when he was young, in order to groom Kevin as an assassin for his firm.

In the final scene Mr. Ficks admits to being the mole and planting the trail to lead Jorgensen to suspect and kill Rosalind, in order that Kevin should kill Jorgensen, and Mr. Ficks could take over the firm from him.

Cast 
 Skeet Ulrich as Kevin Burke
 Kristy Swanson as Tessa Jansen
 Rena Owen as Karina
 Katherine Lang as Rosalind
 Derek de Lint as Karl Jorgensen
 Antonie Kamerling as Karl Jorgensen Jr.
 Serge-Henri Valcke as Mr. Ficks

Production 
The film is presented in 1.85:1 anamorphic widescreen. Much of the film is shot in blue mood lighting. The film makes extensive use of flashbacks.

References

External links 
 
 

2002 thriller films
2000s English-language films